Martyna Galant (born 26 January 1995) is a Polish middle-distance runner specialising in the 1500 metres. She won a bronze medal at the 2017 European U23 Championships.

International competitions

Personal bests

Outdoor
800 metres – 2:02.97 (Białystok 2017)
1000 metres – 2:41.87 (Sopot 2017)
1500 metres – 4:08.81 (Bydgoszcz 2017)
2000 metres – 5:50.54 (Angers 2017)

Indoor
800 metres – 2:03.47 (Toruń 2017)

References

1995 births
Living people
Polish female middle-distance runners
People from Gniezno County
Sportspeople from Greater Poland Voivodeship
Competitors at the 2017 Summer Universiade
Athletes (track and field) at the 2020 Summer Olympics
Olympic athletes of Poland
20th-century Polish women
21st-century Polish women